Daniel Okeke (born 26 December 2001) is an Irish rugby union player who is currently a member of Munster's academy. He plays in the back-row and represents Limerick club Shannon in the amateur All-Ireland League.

Early life
Born in Limerick, Okeke first began playing rugby with Thomond, before attending Ardscoil Rís, where his strong carrying and try-scoring performances in the Munster Schools Rugby Senior Cup caught media attention.

Munster
Strong performances for famous Limerick amateur club Shannon saw Okeke, who was part of the National Talent Squad, earn an appearance for Munster A in December 2020, before he joined the Munster academy ahead of the 2021–22 season. Following the disruption caused by the province's recent tour to South Africa, Okeke made his senior competitive debut for Munster in their opening 2021–22 Champions Cup fixture away to English club Wasps on 12 December 2021, starting in the province's 35–14 win.

Ireland
Okeke was selected in the Ireland under-20s squad for the 2021 Six Nations Under 20s Championship, and made a try-scoring debut off the bench in Ireland's 40–12 win against Wales. He then featured off the bench again in the 24–15 defeat against England, and made his first start for Ireland in their 30–23 win against Italy.

References

External links
Munster Academy Profile

2001 births
Living people
People educated at Ardscoil Rís, Limerick
Rugby union players from Limerick (city)
Irish rugby union players
Thomond RFC players
Shannon RFC players
Munster Rugby players
Rugby union flankers
Rugby union number eights
Black Irish sportspeople